Daniel Mills Pappoe (born 30 December 1993) is a Ghanaian professional footballer who plays as a defender for Carshalton Athletic. He previously played for Crawley Town, Brighton & Hove Albion, Chelsea and Colchester United.

Club career

Chelsea
Pappoe joined Chelsea as a schoolboy at under-12 level. He featured for the Chelsea reserves during the 2009–10 season while still studying at school.  He was the captain of the FA Youth Cup-winning squad of 2010, though he missed the final through injury.

He played nine reserve games, but was sent off against Blackpool after lashing out at an opponent. He missed the start of the 2011–12 season with injuries, returning in early 2012, only to suffer another serious injury, where he was ruled out for the remainder of the season. He returned to action with the youth and reserve teams part-way through the 2012–13 season, and featured in the semi-final and final of the 2012–13 NextGen Series, where the Blues finished as runners-up to Aston Villa.

Loan spells
Yet to make his Chelsea first-team debut, Pappoe signed on loan with League One club Colchester United on 16 July 2013, teaming up with fellow Chelsea youth-team product Sam Walker in his second loan-spell with the U's. He made his professional debut as an 86th-minute substitute for Alex Gilbey in a 2–2 draw with Bradford City on 14 September. However, just four minutes after coming on, he was given a red card for a tackle on former Colchester player Mark Yeates, becoming the seventh United player to be sent off on their debut. On 31 October 2013, Pappoe's loan at Colchester was terminated due to his opportunities being limited.

Following Pappoe's unsuccessful loan spell at Colchester United, he joined Isthmian Premier League side Kingstonian on a one-month loan deal.

Post Chelsea career
On 4 August 2014, Pappoe along with former Chelsea teammate George Cole, joined the development squad of Brighton & Hove Albion signing a one-year deal. However, on 30 June 2015, Pappoe was released at the expiry of his short-term deal without making a single appearance for Brighton.

On 25 October 2015, Pappoe joined Isthmian Premier Division side Hampton & Richmond Borough on a non-contract deal. However, after failing to make an appearance under manager Alan Dowson, Pappoe left the club.

On 19 December 2015, Pappoe joined National League South side Hemel Hempstead Town on a short-term deal. On the same day, Pappoe made his Hemel Hempstead Town debut in a 2–0 victory over Oxford City, playing the full 90 minutes. After only making four more appearances, Pappoe made the switch to German side Berliner AK 07. Although after making only making one appearance, Pappoe returned to England to re-join Hemel Hempstead Town, where he went onto make only four more league appearances.

On 9 August 2016, Pappoe joined League Two side Crawley Town on a non-contract basis, re-uniting with former Chelsea Reserves and Academy manager Dermot Drummy. On 4 October 2016, after almost two months after signing for Crawley, Pappoe was given his debut in a 2–0 victory over Charlton Athletic in an EFL Trophy tie, replacing Mark Connolly with eight minutes remaining.

On 11 January 2017, Pappoe joined Maldives-based side New Radiant, after failing to impress at Crawley. However, after three weeks of his arrival in the Maldives, his contract with New Radiant was promptly rescinded and he was given ten days notice after the club assessed his performance as poor. It was also confirmed that he had a pre-existing knee injury that he had failed to declare pre-transfer.

On 22 August 2017, Pappoe joined Romanian side Foresta Suceava although doubts about his fitness status still remain.

Pappoe had been playing for Carshalton Athletic from 15 September to 16 December 2018 on loan from Dulwich Hamlet. However, on 28 January 2019, he signed permanently for Carshalton Athletic.

After a short-term spell at Worthing during a disrupted 2021–22 campaign due to the COVID-19 pandemic, Pappoe joined Wingate & Finchley in August 2021 and made twenty appearances. In January 2022, he returned to divisional rivals Carshalton Athletic for a third time and went straight into the side for the tie against Cheshunt.

International career
In 2013, he represented Ghana's under-20 national team in the four-team Valais Youth Cup. He played in games versus Kosovo and Brazil. He was initially named in the FIFA U-20 World Cup squad but was later replaced by Baba Mensah.

Personal life
Pappoe was born in Accra, Ghana. He grew up in the Deptford area of South East London. He lived in the Cobham area when he joined the Chelsea Youth Academy as a school boy.

Career statistics

References

External links

1993 births
Living people
Footballers from Accra
Ghanaian footballers
Ghana under-20 international footballers
Association football defenders
English Football League players
National League (English football) players
Isthmian League players
Liga II players
Berliner AK 07 players
Chelsea F.C. players
Colchester United F.C. players
Crawley Town F.C. players
Brighton & Hove Albion F.C. players
Hemel Hempstead Town F.C. players
Hampton & Richmond Borough F.C. players
New Radiant S.C. players
ACS Foresta Suceava players
Dulwich Hamlet F.C. players
Carshalton Athletic F.C. players
Worthing F.C. players
Wingate & Finchley F.C. players
Ghanaian expatriate footballers
Ghanaian expatriate sportspeople in England
Expatriate footballers in England
Ghanaian expatriate sportspeople in Germany
Expatriate footballers in Germany
Ghanaian expatriate sportspeople in Romania
Expatriate footballers in Romania